Hammargren is a Swedish surname. Notable people with the surname include:

 Christer Hammargren (born 1944), Swedish motorcycle racer
 Lonnie Hammargren (born 1937), American politician and neurosurgeon

See also
 Hammergren

Swedish-language surnames